Schefferville/Squaw Lake Water Aerodrome  is located on Lac de la Squaw (Squaw Lake), near Schefferville, Quebec, Canada.

See also
Schefferville Airport

References

Registered aerodromes in Côte-Nord
Seaplane bases in Quebec